LME Nickel stands for a group of spot, forward, and futures contracts, trading on the London Metal Exchange (LME), for delivery of primary Nickel that can be used for price hedging, physical delivery of sales or purchases, investment, and speculation. Producers, semi-fabricators, consumers, recyclers, and merchants can use Nickel futures contracts to hedge Nickel price risks and to reference prices. As of December 31, 2019, LME Nickel is associated with 153,318 tonnes of physical Nickel stored in 500 LME approved warehouses around the world. This is 5.67% of the 2019 global estimated mined Nickel production of 2.7 million tonnes. Despite the low share of physical Nickel associated with LME Nickel contracts, global physical Nickel transactions are usually based on LME Nickel prices. This practice began in the 1970s to 1982, when producer Nickel prices, especially Canadian producer prices collapsed, and the industry switched to LME prices.

History 
From World War One to the late 1970s, world Nickel prices were generally set by producer price lists. Three main suppliers, INCO, Falconbridge, and Société Le Nickel produced around 75% of world Nickel demand and largely controlled pricing.

Development of LME Nickel prices as benchmark prices  
Large producers began to lose pricing power in the 1970s due to three factors.
First, technological development of AOD processes and Laterite ore processing led to the many new Nickel producers entering the market. Second, a 1969 strike in Canada, and subsequent strikes, led to Nickel shortages and price spikes, which caused some nickel buyers to lose faith in producer list pricing. Third, market participants started to realize that producer list pricing worked only when demand is high and producers stocks were low; when demand weakened producers were forced to discount from official producer list prices to secure orders. Producer price lists became less relevant throughout the 1970s and physical Nickel trades gradually adopted LME Nickel prices as benchmark prices thereafter.

2022 suspension of Nickel trading by the LME 

The LME nickel market was severely disrupted in March 2022.  The LME suspended trading on 8 March 2022—halting trade in all nickel contracts, and canceling all trades executed on or after midnight local time. The market remained shut down for more than a week, reopening on 16 March, only to shutdown again when it quickly hit the price decline limit of 5 percent. It hit the expanded limit of 8 percent on 17 March, shutting down again for the day, and the larger expanded limit of 12% price decline on 18 March.  The turmoil began two weeks after the Russian invasion of Ukraine and some see Russia's large nickel exports as a related cause. 
Other causes were related to a large short interest in nickel. In the several months leading to March 2022, Xiang Guangda began taking a large short position in nickel through Tsingshan Group, in order to hedge against falling prices. Due to a rise in nickel prices by early March, Xiang was forced to purchase nickel contracts at the LME, creating a short squeeze. By the time trading had been suspended, Tsingshan had suffered US$8 billion in losses on paper.

Since traders cannot exit their long positions in nickel with the LME shut down, some analysts have pointed out that this, while legal, has created "another example of a breach of social contract between the exchanges and investors, and further widens the gap between trust and mistrust."

Contract description
LME Nickel contracts trade on the London Metal Exchange, which introduced them in 1979.
The contracts require physical delivery of the asset for settlement, and deliverable assets for the contracts are 6 tonnes of Nickel of 99.80% purity (minimum) conforming to B39-79 (2008). The contracts prices are quoted in US dollars per tonne, but can also be settled or cleared in Japanese Yen, UK Sterling, and the Euro. LME Nickel prices have minimum tick sizes of $5.00 per tonne (or $30.00 for one contract) for open outcry trading in the LME Ring and electronic trading on LMEselect, while minimum tick sizes are reduced for inter-office telephone trading to $0.01 per tonne (or $0.50 for one contract). Carry trades involving Nickel futures also have reduced minimum tick sizes at $0.01 per tonne. Contracts are organized along LME's prompt date (or delivery date) structure.

Prompt date structure
LME offers three groups of LME Nickel contracts with daily, weekly, and monthly delivery dates. Contracts with daily settlement dates are available from two days to three months in the future, which means that on 2020-05-12, contracts with daily delivery dates for 2020-05-14, 2020-05-18, 2020-05-19 ... 2020-08-10, 2020-08-11, and 2020-08-12 are available for trading. Contracts with weekly settlement dates are available from three months to six months in the future, which means that on 2020-05-12, contracts with weekly delivery dates for 2020-08-12, 2020-08-19, 2020-08-26 ... 2020-11-12, 2020-11-18, and 2020-11-25 are available for trading. Contracts with monthly settlement dates are available from six months to 63 months in the future, which means that on 2020-05-12, contracts with monthly delivery dates for 2020-05-20, 2020-06-17, 2020-07-15, ... 2025-06-19, 2025-07-17, and 2025-08-21 are available for trading.

Non-commercial Uses
LME Nickel futures contract prices serves as a platform for Nickel price discovery because futures markets are more publicly visible and more accessible, due to lower transaction costs, for a larger number of buyers and sellers than the cash market. A larger number of buyers and sellers in the futures market allows those market participants to incorporate more demand and supply information into the futures price compared with the cash price. Empirical tests have shown that LME Nickel spot and futures markets are closely linked, although sometimes the spot market serves as a source of price discovery for the LME Nickel futures market rather than the reverse.

LME Nickel contracts with delivery dates up to 63 months into the future are available, and prices of those contracts can produce forecasts of the spot price of Nickel at those delivery times. However, LME Nickel price forecasts of spot Nickel prices were found to exhibit biases.

LME Nickel futures prices are also a part of both the Bloomberg Commodity Index and the S&P GSCI commodity index, which are benchmark indices widely followed in financial markets by traders and institutional investors. Its weighting in these commodity indices give LME Nickel prices non-trivial influence on returns on a wide range of investment funds and portfolios.

Related derivatives
LME also offers other derivatives related to LME Nickel futures contracts, such as Options, TAPOs, Monthly Average Futures, LMEminis, and TAS contracts.

The Shanghai Futures Exchange (SHFE) offers Nickel futures contracts for trading as well, SHFE contracts are for 1 metric tonnes of Nickel Cathode as prescribed in the National Standard of GB/T 6516-2010 Ni9996, with the total content of nickel and cobalt > 99.96%. SHFE Nickel contract rices are quoted in Yuan per tonne.

Financial market conventions and empirical studies have grouped Nickel futures contracts with other base metals futures contracts together as an asset class or a sub-asset class. The Base Metals grouping usually includes futures contracts on Aluminium (sometimes including Aluminium Alloy contracts), Copper, Lead, Nickel, Tin, and Zinc, and they are also sometimes called Industrial Metals, Non-ferrous Metals, and Non-precious Metals. All of the metals in this group have associated LME contracts available for trading.

Pricing factors
Warehouse stock levels, or amounts, movement, and distribution of physical Nickel stored in both LME approved and non-approved warehouses, affects LME Nickel pricing. Nickel stocks in LME approved warehouses are relatively transparent, while Nickel stocks at non-LME approved warehouses can be hidden or difficult to interpret. Relatively low warehouse stocks can signal lack of supply or extra demand for Nickel and drive up Nickel prices. While low warehouse stocks can signal abundant supply or low demand for Nickel and drive down prices. Nickel warehouse stocks in regions that historically consume high levels of Nickel matter more in supply and demand terms than stocks in regions that historically consume low levels of Nickel, and thus have higher impact on Nickel pricing. LME warehouses are chosen worldwide to be close to sources demand rather than supply, ensuring that the buyer has immediate access to metals they purchased on the LME. However, China does not allow warehouses in its territory to become LME-registered, and metal for Chinese delivery is typically shipped from Singapore or South Korea. Inventory figures across all warehouses are published daily by the LME.

References 

Nickel
Futures markets